The 2020 season was Beijing Sinobo Guoan F.C.'s 56th season in football competition and the club's 17th consecutive season in the Chinese Super League since the league's founding in the 2004. It is the team's 30th consecutive season in the top flight of Chinese football. It covers a period from 1 January 2020 to 31 December 2020.

Summary

Pre-season
Guoan announced a 1-year contract extension for manager Bruno Génésio on 5 December 2019, confirming that he would remain for the start of the 2020 season.

Club veteran and former captain Yang Zhi parted with the club after his contract expired on 31 December 2019. Hu Yanqiang and Zhang Yu also left Guoan for trials at other football clubs. Chi Wenyi and Jin Pengxiang returned from their respective loan spells. Jiang Tao's contract with the club expired at the end of the previous season but was invited to pre-season training with the team.

The team regrouped on 3 January 2020 and headed to Murcia for the first pre-season training camp in hope of gaining fitness and match preparedness. The team participated in two friendlies, in which Guoan won 1–0 against the AFE Trial Team and lost 2–5 against 1. FC Heidenheim. All three Guoan goals came from Renato Augusto.

Due to the COVID-19 pandemic, the team altered original plans of training in Hainan and instead traveled to Jeju City on 29 January for further pre-season training after the Lunar New Year. On 30 January, the Chineses Football Association announced that all matches in Chinese soccer would be delayed indefinitely in order to minimize chances for infection. Asian Football Confederation also changed AFC Champions League schedule with Guoan playing first two group stage games away from home.

On 3 February, the club announced the arrival of Tianjin TEDA's Yang Fan. The transfer cost the club ¥2000M and Lei Tenglong joins Tianjin TEDA in the same deal. The club also announced the contract extension to the end of the 2020 season of Jiang Tao.

February
On 18 February, Wang Ziming scored the sole goal in the opening game of the season, putting Guoan 0–1 past Chiangrai United in both teams' first match in the AFC Champions League Group Stage. The team then went on another break as the coronavirus delayed the opening of Chinese Super League. The team planned on regrouping on 10 March for further preparation in the UAE. Players were instructed not to return to China as a measure to prevent infection.

On 23 February, Zhang Yu and Liu Huan's respective loans to Changchun Yatai and Chongqing Lifan were announced. The club announced on 29 February that A Lan would join the team on loan from Guangzhou Evergrande for the season.

March
On 2 March, The AFC announced postponement of Champions League matches due to the intensifying COVID-19 pandemic with the second to sixth round of the group stage to be played in May and June, and all previously postponed games must be rescheduled before August. Because of this rescheduling, the team no longer had matches in March and April, and therefore ordered players previously on break abroad to return to China on 9 March. After a short stay in Beijing, the team departed for Kunming on 31 March for a 25-day long preparation.

April 
Players arrived in Kunming and began training. Li Ke, who was on break in Los Angeles, returned to China and underwent the mandatory 14-day coronavirus quarantine before joining the team in Kunming. On 14 April, AFC announced that previously rescheduled Champions League matches in May and June would be further postponed. The team concluded the Kunming training camp on 24 April and players again went on break. They were ordered not to leave China as the Chinese government restricted reentry in the context of the COVID-19 pandemic. China placed a nationwide ban on most foreign visitors, leaving the return date of foreign players, including Augusto, Bakambu, Viera and Fernando, as well as coach Bruno Génésio, unknown. Hou Yongyong and A Lan, although naturalized and allowed to return, faced travel difficulties as the number of international flights are greatly reduced.

May 
The team regrouped on 11 May and underwent coronavirus testing. After being cleared, team members began their training camp at Beijing Renhe's training facilities. Hou Yongyong and A Lan landed in China on 11 May and 14 May respectively and began their mandatory quarantine per Chinese government regulations. On 16 May, Guoan defeated Beijing Renhe 2–0 in a friendly game with 30-minute halves. Zhang Yuning and Wang Ziming scored for Guoan. On 22 May, Guoan lost 0–2 to Renhe in the second friendly between the two teams.

June 
Hou Yongyong and A Lan completed their quarantine requirements and joined the team on 3 June and 5 June respectively. On 5 June, Guoan defeated Tianjin TEDA 5–0 in a friendly with goals from Wang Ziming,  Zhang Yuning, Jin Pengxiang, and a brace from A Lan. Guoan moved to Gaoxin Training Base in the Fengtai District of Beijing on 8 June and held a public training session on 12 June. However, after the reemergence of coronavirus cases in Beijing's Xinfadi Market, the scheduled friendlies against Hebei China Fortune on 13 June and against Shandong Luneng on 17 and 20 June were cancelled. The team subsequently announced a break on 15 June lasting until 22 June. Everyone involved in training were tested for coronavirus infection and everyone was cleared. The team resumed training at training facilities located in Xianghe, Hebei on 22 June. It was reported on 23 June that Guoan's foreign players and coaches successfully obtained Chinese visa and the team is working on their return following other CSL Super League clubs' success in doing so. Manager Bruno Génésio entered China via Shanghai on 22 June and is currently undergoing mandatory quarantine. Bakambu and two assistant coaches arrived at Shanghai as well on 26 June. Guoan played a friendly against Beijing Sport University F.C. at its Xianghe training camp on 26 June as well. Guoan won 4–3 with Piao Cheng scoring two and Zhang Xizhe and Wang Ziming each netting one.

July 
The Chinese FA announced on 1 July that the 2020 season of Chinese Super League would commence on 25 July. The 16 teams would be split into two groups competing respectively in Dalian and Suzhou. Guoan was placed into Group B and will play in Suzhou. The first four places of each group would enter the Championship stage to compete for the overall league winner, and the bottom four places of each group would enter the Relegation stage, through which three relegation teams would be determined. The summer transfer window also opened on 1 July and is set to last until 30 July. Chi Wenyi left the team for Hebei China Fortune.

Guoan flew to Shanghai on 2 July for final preparation before the league's official start and played 4 friendly matches to enhance match preparedness. Guoan played Zhejiang Greentown in a friendly on 4 July and won 1–0 courtesy of A Lan's goal. On 5 July, Viera arrived in Shanghai while Kim Min-jae landed in Shenyang, and both are undergoing mandatory COVID-19 quarantine. Augusto and Fernando landed in Shanghai on 7 July aboard a club-chartered plane, while manager Bruno Génésio completed his quarantine requirement and joined team training. The team lost a friendly 1–4 against Nantong Zhiyun on 8 July with A Lan's penalty the only Guoan goal.  Bakambu completed his quarantine and joined team training on 10 July. On 11 July, Guoan won 6–1 against Shanghai Jiading with A Lan and Zhang Yuning each scoring a brace along with goals from Wang Ziming and Ba Dun. 14 July saw Guoan victorious against Zhejiang Greentown in a friendly thanks to a penalty from A Lan and a goal from Bakambu. On 17 July, Guoan emerged victorious in a friendly against Shanghai Shenhua with Hou Yongyong scoring in the 70th minute. The team headed to Suzhou on 19 July ahead of the opening league match. 20 July saw Viera and Kim complete their respective quarantine requirements and both players joined the team in Suzhou. Augusto and Fernando joined team training after completing their quarantine on 22 July, marking the first time the entire first team squad is together in training since the February.

In the Chinese Super League season opener on 26 July, Li Lei and Piao Cheng netted a goal each to secure a 1–2 victory against Chongqing Lifan despite Yang Fan's red card in the 25th minute.

August 
On 1 August, Viera's goal in the third minute separated Guoan from Wuhan Zall. In the 6 August game against Tianjin TEDA, goals from A Lan and Zhang Xizhe together with an own goal from opposition player saw Guoan win 1–3. A Lan netted his first goal for the club and Zhang Xizhe became the club's all-time top scorer with 41 goals total. Piao Cheng suffered a torn ACL during the game and will be out for an estimated 8 to 10 months. On 12 August, Jin Taiyan, Zhang Yuning and Hou Yongyong contributed goals in Guoan's 3–1 victory against Hebei China Fortune, extending the team's winning streak to four games as Guoan remains top of the Group B table. On 16 August, Guoan gave up the three goal lead courtesy from Bakambu, A Lan and Hou Yongyong and was only able to manage a 3–3 draw against Qingdao Huanghai. The team suffered its first loss of the season on 22 August against Shanghai SIPG. Despite Bakambu scoring an early lead, the game ended 1–2 in favor of Shanghai SIPG. On 27 August, Guoan's winless streak stretched to 3 games as it tied Shijiazhuang Even Bright 2–2. A Lan scored in the 24th minute to give Guoan an early lead, but Guo Quanbo received a red card for his goalkeeping against an opposition free kick taken quickly. Bakambu scored the equalizing penalty in the 73rd minute.

September 
On 1 September, Guoan won 5–2 against Chongqing Lifan with Bakambu scoring four and Wang Ziming netting the other, ending Guoan's three-game winless streak. Chinese FA announced the dates to CSL championship stage and Chinese FA Cup matches on 2 September. Guoan is drawn against Qingdao Huanghai in the FA Cup and the match is set to take place on 19 September. 6 September saw Guoan concede two after leading through goals from Bakambu and Zhang Yuning, resulting in a 2–2 draw against Wuhan Zall. Guoan kept its first clean sheet in eight rounds in the 10 September match against Tianjin TEDA, winning 2–0 as Zhang Yuning and Augusto netted ond in each half. On 15 September, Guoan signed Bosnian center back Toni Šunjić from Russian club Dynamo Moscow. On the same day, Guoan led Hebei China Fortune 3–1 at the 88th minute with goals from Augusto, Bakambu and A Lan, but  only managed to produce a 3–3 draw at the final whistle.

On 19 September, Guoan played Qingdao Huanghai in the first round of the Chinese FA Cup. Cléo scored the opener in the 31st minute for Huanghai from a foul that resulted in a penalty. A Lan failed to convert the penalty from an opposition handball in the box but managed to score the rebound, tying the game just before halftime. A Lan scored a header in the 69th minute to put Guoan in the lead. Zou Dehai secured Guoan's win when he held onto Cléo penalty in the 91st minute. Guoan advances to the next round with a result of 2–1.

22 September saw Guoan win 5–1 against Qingdao Huanghai in the CSL. Viera scored two with Yu Yang, Fernando and Bakambu each netting one. With the win, Guoan secured its place in the league's Championship Stage two matchdays in advance as it became mathematically impossible for the team to fall outside of fourth place within its Qualification Stage group. On 25 September, Guoan lost 0–1 to Shanghai SIPG, a loss which made Guoan mathematically impossible to win in Group B of the CSL Group Stage. The Guoan side was not satisfied with the match result and claimed foul play from the referee. Guoan finished the Group Stage with a 4–0 win against Shijiazhuang Ever Bright. Two goals from Fernando and a goal each from Bakambu and Ba Dun helped seal the victory. A short holiday commenced for the players until 11 October.

On 30 September, Guoan announced that new signing Toni Šunjić would be loaned out to Henan Jianye for the remainder of the season due to registration regulations of the CSL.

October 
Guoan regrouped in Beijing on 7 October and player a friendly against Beijing Institute of Technology F.C. on 10 October, which Guoan won 7–1. Guoan headed for Suzhou for the CSL championship stage on 11 October.

Guoan's first game in the championship stage, which sees the top 8 teams from the qualification stage play two-leg elimination matches until the final winner is determined, was played on 17 October against Shandong Luneng. Guoan conceded twice in the first half, but managed to tie the game thanks to Bakambu converting a penalty in the 49th minute and then scoring a header off of Li Lei's cross in the 69th minute. The first leg ended 2–2. Bakambu, with the double, became Guoan's all-time top scorer in the top flight Chinese football with 44 goals, overtaking teammate Zhang Xizhe's 43 goals for the club.

Guoan played its second leg against Shandong Luneng, which was also the 900th competitive match in club history, on 22 October. Despite conceding in the 15th minute, Zhang Yuning scored twice in the 19th and 75th minute, leading a successful Guoan comeback and securing progression to the semi-finals of the championship stage, pitting Guoan against Guangzhou Evergrande. Zhang's first goal was also the 1400th goal in club history.

On 28 October, Guoan player the first leg of its semi-final in the CSL championship stage against Guangzhou Evergrande. Jin Taiyan deputized at left-back for the injured Li Lei. Both Augusto and Bakambu hit the woodwork in the first half, and Guangzhou Evergrande hit the woodwork twice during the match as well. However, neither team was able to score, and the game ended in a 0–0 tie.

November 
On 2 November, Guoan played Guangzhou Evergrande in the second leg of the CSL championship stage semi-finals. In the 39th minute following a Guangzhou corner, Zhang Yuning was judged by the referee to have committed a foul in the penalty area, leading to an opposition penalty which Talisca converted. Before the halftime whistle blew, Wang Gang went to ground in Guangzhou's penalty area, but the Korean referee Kim Hee-gon deemed that there was no foul. In the second half, Guangzhou scored a second in the 56th minute before Zhang Yuning was able to pull one back for Guoan off of a Li Lei cross in the 61st minute. However, Guangzhou managed to score again in the 81st minute, handing Guoan a 3–1 loss and thus eliminating the team from champion contention.

7 November saw Guoan play against Shanghai SIPG to determine the final league table in the first leg of a two-leg 3rd and 4th place play-off. Wang Gang fought his way through inside the penalty box after Zhang Xizhe's long cross-field pass found him, and fed Bakambu for the Guoan lead in the 26th minute. In the second half, Chi Zhongguo tapped in Guoan's second of the day when the opposition goalie spilled A Lan's shot. Unfortunately in the 90th minute, an opposition shot came off the crossbar and bounced off of Guo Quanbo for an own goal. Guoan managed a 1–2 away win in the end.

On November 11, Guoan played Shanghai SIPG in the second leg of the third-place playoff. A Lan netted the bottom right corner of the goal off of a Zhang Yuning through ball in the 31st minute, only for opposition player to equalize two minutes after half-time. Hou Sen made a series of outstanding saves to deny Shanghai SIPG of further chances, and the game ended in a 1–1 draw. With Guoan leading the aggregated score 3–2, the team finished this season's CSL campaign in 3rd place, clinching a direct qualification to next season's AFC Champions League.

Guoan arrived in Doha, where all further AFC Champions League games for this season would be held, on 17 November. On 21 November, Guoan played its second game in the group stage against FC Seoul. Fernando opened the scoring for Guoan after only 8 minutes in this tightly contested match, and A Lan doubled Guoan's lead in the 60th minute through a shot outside the box. However, a handball from Kim Min-jae allowed the opponent to pull one back in the 66th minute. With no further goal scored, the game ended with a 2–1 victory for Guoan, elevating Guoan into first place in group E.

Guoan player its third game in the AFC Champions League group against Australian side Melbourne Victory on 24 October. Augusto opened the scoring for Guoan in the 22nd minute with A Lan scoring a header to increase the Guoan's lead in the 34th minute. Wang Ziming netted another in the 74th minute. Despite an opposition shot that ricocheted off Kim Min-jae landing in Guoan's goal, the game ended in a comfortable 3–1 victory for Guoan.

Guoan's fourth game in the group stage came on 27 November, when the team played its against Melbourne Victory again. Viera opened the game in just 9 minutes, putting the ball past the opposition goalkeeper from a Wang Gang cross. Zhang Yuning then netted in the 35th minute, turning and shooting from a Viera through ball. The game ended 0–2 for Guoan and with 4 consecutive wins Guoan qualified two games in advance for the Round of 16.

On 28 November, Guoan played in the second round of the Chinese FA Cup against Chengdu Better City. As the first team was in Doha competing in the AFC Champions League, Guoan had to utilize its reserve team and named a starting lineup with an average age of just 19.19 years. In the 8th minute of the game, Ling Zhongyang floated a cross into the box, and with Li Boxi as a dummy attracting the attention of the opposition defender, Xie Longfei was able to produce a clean finish giving Guoan the 1–0 lead. After two red cards for the opposition and five yellows for Guoan, the lead held and Guoan advanced to the quarter-finals 1–0 to play Wuhan Zall.

30 November saw Guoan win its fifth straight group stage game in the AFC Champions League against FC Seoul. Viera struck first in the 23rd minute with a curling free kick beyond the goalkeeper. Augusto added to the tally just before half-time, side volleying home a Wang Gang cross. Opposition striker scored in the 89th minute, but Zhang Yuning sealed the game in the 93rd as he rounded the goalkeeper and put the ball into the empty net. The 3–1 victory put Guoan's group stage talley at 15 points and guaranteed Guoan's first place in Group E.

December 
Guoan and its reserve team continued the journey in the Chinese FA Cup on 2 December, playing against Wuhan Zall. Guoan conceded in the 4th minute as goalie Ma Kunyue hesitated and had the ball taken from him within his own penalty area. Guoan fell two goals behind in the 12th minute as Ma Kunyue and Ling Zhongyang miscommunicated, allowing opposition striker to gain possession within Guoan's own penalty area. A counterattack by Wuhan in the 38th minute led to Guoan conceding a third goal. The game ended 0–3 to Wuhan, and Guoan was thus knocked out of the competition.

Guoan played its last group stage game in the AFC Champions League on 3 December against Chiangrai United. Guoan fell behind in the 55th minute, but A Lan came on and headed in a goal in the 76th minute to draw Guoan level. Guoan had the chance to win the game in stoppage time when a penalty was given against the opposition, but A Lan hit the post with his shot. The game ended 1–1, and Guoan will play FC Tokyo next in the round of 16.

Guoan faced round of 16 opponent FC Tokyo on 6 December. After a lackluster first half, A Lan power in a goal in the penalty box from an Augusto pass. Guoan held on to the lead and the game ended 1–0, with Guoan advancing to the quarter finals. Guoan drew against Ulsan Hyundai in the quarter-finals.

On 10 December, Guoan played against Ulsan Hyundai in the quarter-finals. Conceding a penalty and a goal, Guoan lost the game 0–2 and is thus eliminated from the competition.

Players 
As of 30 September 2020

Transfers

In

Out

Friendlies

Competitions

Overview

Chinese Super League
On 1 July, Chinese Football Association announced that the season would resume on 25 July and 16 teams would be split into two groups competing respectively in Dalian and Suzhou. Guoan is placed into Group B. The first four places of each group would enter the Championship stage to compete for the overall league winner, and the bottom four places of each group would enter the Relegation stage, through which three relegation teams would be determined. The Championship and Relegation stage consists of three rounds of home and away games against different opponents to determine the final league ranking.

Results summary

Qualification stage

Group B League table

Results by round

Matches

Championship Stage 
The championship stage consists of the top 8 teams from the qualification stage. Teams play two-leg elimination matches until the final winner is determined.

Matches

Chinese FA Cup

Beijing Guoan joined the competition in the first round.

AFC Champions League

Beijing Guoan joined the competition in the group stage.

Group stage

Knockout stage

Statistics

Appearances and goals

Goals

Assists

Clean sheets

Disciplinary record

Notes

References

Beijing Guoan F.C. seasons
Beijing Sinobo Guoan F.C.